Hoeke is a village in Damme, a municipality in West Flanders, Belgium.

External links
Hoeke @ City Review

Populated places in West Flanders
Damme